Gholsonville is an unincorporated community located in Brunswick County, in the U.S. state of Virginia. It is the birthplace of former United States Representative James Gholson.

References
 

Unincorporated communities in Virginia
Unincorporated communities in Brunswick County, Virginia